Sergey Kovalchuk may refer to:
Serghei Covalciuc (born 1982), Moldovan footballer
Syarhey Kavalchuk (born 1978), Belarusian footballer
Sergey Petrovich Kovalchuk (born 1973), Belarusian footballer and coach